The Instituto Nacional de Estadística de Bolivia or National Institute of Statistics of Bolivia is a branch of the Government of Bolivia which specifically collects factual data in the country of Bolivia in South America. The Institute compiles statistics ranging from the area of its provinces and municipalities to population structure, and demographics and education. It also provides information on transport services and industry and salary details and electricity rates.

References

Government of Bolivia